Carnival Row is an American neo-noir fantasy television series created by René Echevarria and Travis Beacham, based on Beacham's unproduced film spec script, A Killing on Carnival Row. The series stars Orlando Bloom, Cara Delevingne, Simon McBurney, Tamzin Merchant, David Gyasi, Andrew Gower, Karla Crome, Arty Froushan, Indira Varma, and Jared Harris. The series follows mythological beings who must survive as oppressed refugees in human society, as a detective works to solve murders connected with them.

Carnival Row first season was released in its entirety on Amazon Prime Video on August 30, 2019. In July 2019, Amazon renewed the series for a second season, which premiered on February 17, 2023, and served as the series' final season, concluding on March 17, 2023.

Premise
In Carnival Row, "mythical creatures... have fled their war-torn homeland and gathered in the city as tensions are simmering between citizens and the growing immigrant population". There is an investigation into a string of unsolved murders, questions of madness of power, unresolved love, and social adjustments eating away at whatever uneasy peace exists.

Cast and characters

Main
 Orlando Bloom as Rycroft "Philo" Philostrate, an inspector of the Burgue Constabulary, investigating a dark conspiracy at the heart of the city. A half-fae passing as a human, and veteran of the war, he sympathizes with the fae to the disgust of many of his colleagues.
 Cara Delevingne as Vignette Stonemoss, a faerie (also known by their derogatory name of "Pix") and Philo's former lover who believed him to be dead following the war. She falls in with a group of fae ruffians known as the Black Raven while dealing with her complicated feelings for Philo.
 Simon McBurney as Runyan Millworthy, a human street performer and master of a troupe of kobolds.
 Tamzin Merchant as Imogen Spurnrose, an heiress who becomes involved with Agreus to support her lifestyle.
 David Gyasi as Agreus Astrayon, a wealthy faun (also known by their derogatory name of "Puck") shunned by Burgue high society for his appearance and origin.
 Andrew Gower as Ezra Spurnrose, Imogen's brother whom she blames for mishandling the family finances and driving them into debt.
 Karla Crome as Tourmaline Larou, Vignette's fae friend and former lover, Poet Laureate of Tirnanoc, and a courtesan at the Tetterby Hotel in Carnival Row.
 Arty Froushan as Jonah Breakspear, Absalom's son who rebels against his controlling father. He becomes the new chancellor at the end of season one.
 Caroline Ford as Sophie Longerbane, the power-seeking daughter of Ritter Longerbane who becomes sympathetic towards the Fae.
 Indira Varma as Piety Breakspear (season 1), Absalom's manipulative wife who seeks to enshrine her family's legacy.
 Jared Harris as Absalom Breakspear (season 1), the chancellor of the Republic of the Burgue.
 Jamie Harris as Sergeant Dombey (season 2; recurring seasons 1–2), a constable sergeant known to harbor racist beliefs against the fae and despises Philo for sympathizing with them.
 Ariyon Bakare as Darius Sykes (season 2; recurring seasons 1–2), Philo's old friend and a former soldier of the Burgue now held in captive luxury at Bleakness Keep due to having been bitten by a Marrok (a type of wolf-man created from a virus) during the war.
 Jay Ali as Kaine (season 2), a fae allied with the Black Raven who goes to extreme measures to make life better for his people.
 Joanne Whalley as Leonora (season 2), a faun with a broken horn and leader of the New Dawn (communist) revolutionary movement.

Recurring
 Alice Krige as Aoife Tsigani, a Haruspex (or witch) in the service of Piety Breakspear.
 Tracey Wilkinson as Afissa, the "Puck" housemaid and cook to the Spurnroses.
 Ryan Hayes as Constable Thatch, a rookie constable with a strong hatred of the fae.
 Waj Ali as Constable Berwick, Philo's timid partner who nevertheless remains loyal to him.
 James Beaumont as Constable Cuppins, a constable who finds Philo's interest in the fae unnatural.
 Jim High as Fergus, a human servant in Agreus' household.
 Scott Reid as Quilliam "Quill", a "Puck" footman, unjustly dismissed by the Chancellor, who turns to radicalism.
 Brian Caspe as Nigel Winetrout, a politician and close advisor for the Breakspear family.
 Chloe Pirrie as Dahlia, the ruthless "Pix" leader of the Black Raven.
 Anthony Kaye as Bolero, the loyal "Pix" second-in-command of the Black Raven.
 Sinead Phelps as Jenila, Sophie's "Puck" lady's maid.
 Season 1
 Maeve Dermody as Portia Fyfe, Philo's landlady whose romantic advances he frequently rebuffs.
 Leanne Best as Madame Moira, the proprietor of The Tetterby Hotel, which she uses as a brothel.
 Anna Rust as Fleury, a "Pix" courtesan at Moira's brothel.
 Ronan Vibert as Ritter Longerbane, Sophie's father, Absalom Breakspear's primary political opponent, and longtime advocate of fae subjugation.
 Mark Lewis Jones as Magistrate Flute, the head constable in the Burgue who urges solidarity amongst his officers and frequently butts heads with Philo over his concern for the fae's welfare.
 Erika Starkova as Aisling Querelle, Philo's mother and a once-famous "Pix" singer turned to the life of a scavenger.
 Theo Barklem-Biggs as Cabal, a "Puck" malcontent seeking to bring his brethren together.
 Season 2
 Fraser James as Erasmus Fletcher, a politician and advisor for the Longerbane family.
 Eve Ponsonby as Phaedra, a "Pix" vigilante and member of the Black Raven.
 Stewart Scudamore as Boz Ghaidos, a well-connected cattle-horned "Puck" who manages an underground fighting ring.
 Andrew Buchan as Mikulas Vir, a general in The Pact army who travels to The Burgue to secure a weapons deal with a secret of his own.
 Karel Dobrý as Ambassador Anrep, the ambassador for The Pact to The Burgue.
 Jacqueline Boatswain as Mima Blodwen, a "Mima" fae, a spiritual leader, who guides Tourmaline.
 George Georgiou as Kastor, a high-ranking member of the New Dawn in charge of overseeing Agreus and Imogen.

Episodes

Season 1 (2019)

Season 2 (2023)

Production

Development
On January 9, 2015, Amazon signed a development deal for the series which, at the time had Guillermo del Toro on board as a co-writer, executive producer, and director. The series, set to be co-written by del Toro, Travis Beacham, and Rene Echeverria, is based on a feature film spec script written by Beacham, entitled A Killing on Carnival Row. The company ordered three scripts with the expectation that if the series went into production del Toro would direct the first episode. On June 6, 2016, the production was given a pilot order with the previously announced creative team still set to be involved.

On May 10, 2017, the production was given a series order with Beacham and Echeverria still executive producing, and with Echeverria expected to act as showrunner. Filmmaker Paul McGuigan was set to direct the series. By this point, del Toro had stepped away from the project, as his feature film schedule did not permit him to stay on as an executive producer as the project moved forward. On November 10, 2017, filmmaker Jon Amiel replaced McGuigan as director.

In July 2019, Amazon renewed the series for a second season. In November 2022, Amazon announced that the second season would serve as the series' last.

Casting
In August 2017, Orlando Bloom and Cara Delevingne were cast in the series' two lead roles. On September 22, 2017, it was reported that David Gyasi, Karla Crome, Indira Varma, and Tamzin Merchant had joined the main cast. In October 2017, it was announced that Simon McBurney, Alice Krige, and Jared Harris had been cast in recurring roles. On November 3, 2017, it was reported Ariyon Bakare was joining the series in a recurring capacity. On December 15, 2017, it was announced that Andrew Gower and Jamie Harris had been cast in recurring roles. On January 30, 2018, it was reported that Scott Reid had joined the cast as a series regular. On October 8, 2018, it was reported that Anna Rust had joined the cast in a recurring capacity.

Filming
The series spent almost five months in pre-production before filming began. The series was shot entirely in the Czech Republic throughout 108 shooting days. Principal photography began in October 2017. Much of the work was done at the Barrandov Studios in Prague, while locations included the city of Liberec, the chateaux in Frýdlant and Krnsko, and at the Prachov Rocks (Prachovské skály) area. Filming for the first season concluded on March 14, 2018.

Production on the second season commenced in November 2019 but was halted in March 2020 due to the coronavirus pandemic. As of the first week of May, preparations for resumption of production were underway. However, by June 2020, Amazon had yet to resume production on the series. Upon production halting due to the pandemic, the production team were reportedly three weeks away from concluding filming for the season. Filming for the second season continued in August 2020 in the Czech Republic. In a February 2021 interview, Tamzin Merchant revealed that only five out of eight episodes were wrapped up. Filming for the second season officially wrapped in September 2021. Production for the second season resumed in May 2021 in the Czech Republic, mainly to film the remaining scenes which involved Orlando Bloom, who was not available in 2020 due to the birth of his child.

Release
On June 3, 2019, it was announced that the series would premiere on August 30, 2019. The second and final season premiered on February 17, 2023, with episodes releasing weekly in batches of two episodes.

Themes

The Chicago Tribune wrote that the show is about government oppression, sexism, and elitism. Travis Beacham, the original script writer and one of the executive producers, said that the show is also about class, race, and immigration. Despite the script being written 17 years before the show's production, the same issues were just as relevant by the time it aired. The show, based on a Victorian fantasy setting, served as a hypothetical space where political and social issues that reflected the real world could be safely discussed.

Reception

Critical response

On Rotten Tomatoes, the first season of Carnival Row holds a 57% approval rating based on 68 reviews. The website's critical consensus reads, "Beautiful, but bloated, Carnival Row boasts meticulously crafted mythology and luscious world building—unfortunately its story of haves and have nots simply has too much going on to create anything cohesive." The second season holds a 44% approval rating based on 16 reviews. On Metacritic, the series has a weighted average score of 58 out of 100, based on 22 critics, indicating "mixed or average reviews".

Sam Brooks of the New Zealand-based The Spinoff noted that the premise of the show is "a mish-mash of influences and inspirations, from Neil Gaiman to Mortal Engines (the novels not the film)".

Accolades
Carnival Row was nominated for Best Genre Series at the 2020 Satellite Awards.

Other media 
 Carnival Row: Tangle in the Dark – An audiobook about the first meeting of Tourmaline and Vignette
 Carnival Row: From the Dark – A comic starring Rycroft
 Carnival Row: Sparrowhawk – A comic starring Vignette
 Carnival Row – A roleplaying setting for the Cypher System by Monte Cook Games
 Tales of Carnival Row – A graphic novel anthology set in the Burgue.

References

External links
 

2010s American drama television series
2010s American supernatural television series
2019 American television series debuts
2020s American drama television series
2020s American supernatural television series
2023 American television series endings
Amazon Prime Video original programming
Dark fantasy television series
English-language television shows
Neo-noir television series
Race and ethnicity in television
Steampunk television series
Television about magic
Television series about immigration
Television series by Amazon Studios
Television series by Legendary Television
Television series created by Travis Beacham
Television shows filmed in the Czech Republic